Matengo is a Bantu language of Tanzania. Speakers are mostly monolingual, and neighboring languages are not intelligible.

Matengo language is relatively related to Ngoni language in that the two have similar history of origin.

References

Rufiji-Ruvuma languages
Languages of Tanzania